Aaron Tänzer (also ; January 30, 1871 – February 26, 1937, Göppingen) was a rabbi in Austria and Germany, chaplain and author.

Biography

He was born in Pressburg, Austria-Hungary (present day Bratislava, Slovakia).

He studied at the Pressburg Yeshiva, and studied Oriental philology and history at the University of Berlin (PhD 1895). In 1896, he was called to Hohenems, Austria as chief rabbi of Tyrol and Vorarlberg; and from 1904 to 1907 he was rabbi of Meran (Tyrol). From 1907 until his death, he served as rabbi of the Jewish community of Göppingen in Württemberg, Germany. His history of the Jews of Göppingen and nearby Jebenhausen is notable as a thorough documentation of a Jewish community from its beginnings.

In World War I, he served as a Feldrabbiner (Jewish chaplain) in the German army, primarily on the Eastern front. He looked after German and Austrian Jewish soldiers and took care of Jewish prisoners of war in POW camps like Doeberitz and Sedan.

Aron Tänzer's father was a rabbi and his mother worked as a seamstress for the Pressburg Jewish community. At the age of 21, Aron Tänzer enrolled at the University of Berlin. He studied philosophy, German and Semitic philology. Aron Tänzer received his doctorate in 1895 and in October 1896 he successfully applied for the vacant rabbinical position in Hohenems, Austria.

The Hohenems rabbinate also supervised nearby Jewish communities in Vorarlberg and, from 1878 to 1914, also formally the Jews living in Tyrol. Tänzer applied his extensive training in history to numerous scientific publications as well as the field of adult education. For example, he often gave lectures on literature and history for the Hohenems Education Club. In 1905 he published the history of the Jews in Hohenems, which is still considered the standard work today. His mindset and religious beliefs were shaped by liberal ideas and cultural openness.

From 1905 to 1907 Tänzer was a rabbi of the Jewish community of Meran [1] and from September 1, 1907, became a rabbi at the Göppingen synagogue. He held this position, in which he was responsible for the Jebenhausen district rabbinate, until his death in 1937. Right at the beginning of the First World War, Tänzer volunteered to work as a field rabbi. He served on the Eastern Front for three years. Tänzer looked after the soldiers, helped in the hospital and set up people's kitchens for the needy population. Tänzer was awarded several medals for his work in the field.

Tänzer laid the foundation for a public library, later the city library in Göppingen, since 1909. Since 1921 he was an honorary member of the Göppingen veterans and military association "Kampfgemeinschaft". The Rabbiner-Tänzer-Haus (Freihofstrasse 46), the former rabbinate building, in Göppingen was dedicated to the Taenzer family.

Works 
 Die Religionsphilosophie Josef Albo's (doctoral dissertation), Frankfort-on-the-Main, 1896
 Der Israelitische Friedhof in Hohenems (Jewish Cemetery Hohenems), Vienna, 1901
 Judenthum und Entwickelungslehre (Judaism and Evolution), Berlin, 1903
 Geschichte der Juden in Tirol und Vorarlberg (History of the Jews in Tirol and Vorarlberg), vol. i, ib. 1903–4.
Die Geschichte der Juden in Hohenems und im übrigen Vorarlberg (History of the Jews in Hohenems and all of Vorarlberg) 1905 
 Die Geschichte der Juden in Jebenhausen und Göppingen (The history of the Jews in Jebenhausen and Göppingen). Reprint of the 1927 edition. Konrad, Weißenhorn 1988,  (published by the Göppingen City Archives. Volume 23)

References 

 Doris Kühner: Der Rabbiner Dr. Aron Tänzer und die jüdische Gemeinde in Göppingen. Zulassungsarbeit zur Ersten Dienstprüfung für das Lehramt an Grund- und Hauptschulen an der PH Schwäbisch Gmünd, Schwäbisch Gmünd 1981 (beim Staatsarchiv Ludwigsburg: EL 251 II Bü 1130) [nicht ausgewertet] (Approval work for the first service examination for the teaching post at primary and secondary schools at the PH Schwäbisch Gmünd, Schwäbisch Gmünd 1981 (at the Ludwigsburg State Archives: EL 251 II Bü 1130)
 Karl Heinz Burmeister (Hrsg.): Rabbiner Dr. Aron Tänzer. Gelehrter und Menschenfreund. 1871−1937, Fink, Bregenz 1987 (Rabbi Dr. Aron Tänzer. Scholar and philanthropist)  (Schriften des Vorarlberger Landesarchivs Nr. 3) (Online-Ausgabe) 
 Uri R. Kaufmann: Die Hohenemser Rabbiner Abraham Kohn und Aron Tänzer und die jüdischen Bestrebungen ihrer Zeit, in: Eva Grabherr (Hg.), "… eine ganz kleine Gemeinde, die nur von den Erinnerungen lebt". Juden in Hohenems (Katalog des Jüdischen Museums Hohenems), Hohenems 1996, S. 45–57  (The Hohenems rabbis Abraham Kohn and Aron Tänzer and the Jewish endeavors of their time, in: Eva Grabherr (ed.), "... a very small community that lives only from memories". Jews in Hohenems (catalog of the Jewish Museum Hohenems), Hohenems 1996, pp. 45–57)
 Karl-Heinz Rueß: Rabbiner Dr. Aron Tänzer: Stationen seines Lebens. Stadt Göppingen, Göppingen 2003,  [nicht ausgewertet]  (Rabbi Dr. Aron dancer: stations in his life. City of Göppingen, Göppingen 2003)

External links

 Biographie bei der Stadt Göppingen, mit vielen Fotos
 Aaron Tänzer bei Alemannia Judaica
 Stolperstein zur Erinnerung an Berta Tänzer 
 
 
 
Guide to the Papers of Arnold Tänzer (1871-1937) at the Leo Baeck Institute, New York.

1871 births
1937 deaths
Rabbis from Bratislava
20th-century Austrian rabbis
Austro-Hungarian rabbis
Chief rabbis
Rabbis in the military
People from Hohenems
People from Merano
Recipients of the Iron Cross (1914), 2nd class
Knights of the Order of Franz Joseph
German Jewish military personnel of World War I
20th-century German rabbis
People from Göppingen